John "Jonty" Alexander Skinner (born 15 February 1954) is a former South African competition swimmer and world record-holder, who became an American college swimming coach and a coach of the US national team.

Swimming career 
Skinner was born in Cape Town, South Africa, and graduated from Selborne College in East London, South Africa.  At the 1973 South African National Swimming Championships he won the 100-metre freestyle event and backed that up by winning the event again at the 1974 National Championships.  He was awarded the title of South Africa Athlete of the Year and was also awarded South African National Colours in Swimming and Life Saving.

He decided to move to the United States and attend the University of Alabama, where he was a member of the Alabama Crimson Tide swimming and diving team in National Collegiate Athletic Association (NCAA) and Southeastern Conference (SEC) competition.  Whilst there, he won gold in the 100-yard freestyle at the 1975 Division I NCAA Men's Swimming and Diving Championships and was voted Alabama's most valuable swimmer in 1975, 1976 and 1977. He was also voted as Alabama's Athlete of the Year.

In 1976, he weighed 185 pounds and stood 6 feet, 5 inches and had a good chance of taking the gold medal in the 100-metre freestyle at the 1976 Summer Olympics in Montreal, Canada, however at the time South Africa was still banned from the Olympics hence making Skinner ineligible to compete.

However, after the completion of the Olympics, at the 1976 United States Summer National Swimming Championships in Philadelphia, Pennsylvania, and after just qualifying for the final, Skinner broke Jim Montgomery's 20-day-old world record in the 100-metre freestyle by 0.55 seconds beating home the Olympic champion and Joe Bottom who won silver in Montreal. His record stood until 3 April 1981 when Rowdy Gaines swam the distance in 49.36 seconds in Texas.

In addition to his world record, he set three American records in the 100 yards freestyle.

In 1985, he was recognised by the swimming world when he was inducted into the International Swimming Hall of Fame as an Honor Swimmer.

Coaching career 
Skinner began his coaching career in 1978 when appointed assistant coach of University of Alabama's swim team. After three years he moved to California and became the head coach of the San Jose Aquatics Club where under his guidance the club won five junior national championship team titles and in 1986 took the national championship team title at Phillips 66 Long Course Senior Nationals. He served as head coach until 1988.

He returned to the University of Alabama in 1988 as assistant head coach, and then took over the reins as the head swimming and diving coach of the men's and women's teams in 1990.

From 1994 to 2000 Skinner served as USA Swimming's resident team coach, which involved coaching some of the nation's top swimmers at the elite national and international level.

From 2000 to 2008 Skinner served as USA Swimming's Director of National Team Technical Support, which involves co-ordinating all of the testing, tracking and assessment of the national team athletes.

He currently operates Athletic Intelligence Consulting and is an UpMyGame coach.

In May 2012 he rejoined the University of Alabama swimming and diving team as an assistant coach.

Personal life 
Skinner currently resides in Tuscaloosa, Alabama, with his wife Carol Ann and two children Cleone and Cydney.

See also
 List of members of the International Swimming Hall of Fame
List of University of Alabama people
World record progression 50 metres freestyle
World record progression 100 metres freestyle

References 

1954 births
Living people
Sportspeople from Cape Town
Alabama Crimson Tide men's swimmers
Alumni of Selborne College
American swimming coaches
Alabama Crimson Tide swimming coaches
World record setters in swimming
South African emigrants to the United States
South African male swimmers
South African swimming coaches